Jammu Cantonment is a cantonment town in Jammu City in the Indian union territory of Jammu and Kashmir.

Demographics
 India census, Jammu Cantonment had a population of 30,107. Males constitute 61% of the population and females 39%. Jammu Cantonment has an average literacy rate of 74%, higher than the national average of 59.5%: male literacy is 80%, and female literacy is 64%. In Jammu Cantonment, 15% of the population is under 6 years of age.

Religion
Hindu 69.43%, Sikh 18.11%, Muslim 10.91%,

References

Cantonments of British India
Cantonments of India
Cities and towns in Jammu district